Boro Rangers Football Club is a football club based in Durham, England. They are currently members of the Northern League Division Two and play at Broughton Road, Stokesley Sports Club F.C..

History
Boro Rangers were founded in 2003, later joining the Teesside League. Following the Teesside League dissolving, the club joined the North Riding League, winning the league seven years in a row. In 2022, the club was admitted into the Northern League Division Two.

Ground
The club started the 2022-23 season at New Ferens Park, Durham but moved to Stokesley Sports Club F.C..

References

Sport in Durham, England
Association football clubs established in 2003
2003 establishments in England
Football clubs in England
Football clubs in County Durham
Teesside Football League
Northern Football League